net263 co., ltd or commonly known as 263.net is a Chinese Internet Service Provider said to be named after the number they used for dial-up access to the Internet. In 2002, the company was sued for breach of contract after attempting to transition to a paid email service, which would have affected 12 million active users.

See also
ICP license
Internet service provider

External links
263.net 网络通信
Irc.263.net – A Chinese-language IRC server maintained by 263. The encoding used is GB 18030 or GB 2312. According to the Norwegian ISP Uninett, the server is to a large extent used to control botnets, and users accessing the server risk being blocked.

References

Internet service providers of China
Companies with year of establishment missing